Richard Ballard (born January 26, 1994) is an American soccer player who currently plays for Detroit City in the USL Championship.

Early life

Personal
Ballard was born in Louisville, Kentucky to John and Debi Ballard, and attended high school at duPont Manual High School.  While at Manual he played three years of varsity soccer.  As a senior he scored 21 goals with 24 assists while leading Manual to the district 12 title and be named to both the All-District and All-State First teams.

College and youth
Ballard played four years of college soccer at Indiana University between 2012 and 2016, including a red-shirted year in 2013.  During his freshman year Ballard appeared in 13 matches, starting four, and was named to the Big Ten Conference All Freshman team.  Ballard and Indiana won the 2012 NCAA Division I Men's Soccer Championship.  Over the next two seasons he appear in 30 matches for Indiana scoring one goal as a junior.  As a senior he started all 21 of Indiana's matches with four goals and 2 assists while being named to the All-Big Ten second team.

While at college, Ballard appeared for Premier Development League side River City Rovers in 2012 and 2013.

Club career

Louisville City

2017 season
Ballard signed with United Soccer League side Louisville City on February 6 and made his professional debut on March 25 against Saint Louis.  He appeared in 25 of Louisville's 32 league matches, being used primarily as a substitute, scoring three goals.  He also appeared in both of Louisville's US Open Cup matches, scoring one goal as well as all four of Louisville' USL Cup Playoff matches.  Although he didn't score in regulation time during any of the USL Cup matches, he converted the final shot of the Penalty shoot-out in the Eastern Conference final against New York Red Bulls II.  Ballard and Louisville won the USL Cup Final against Swope Park with Ballard being named a finalist for USL Rookie of the Year.

2018 season
Ballard had his contract renewed with Louisville and he made his season debut on March 17 against USL expansion side Nashville SC.  In early April Ballard suffered a stress fracture causing him to miss significant time.  He finished the year making only four appearances across Louisville's 34 league matches without scoring a goal.  Although he didn't make an appearance in any of Louisville's four USL Cup playoff matches Ballard and Louisville went on to win the USL Cup Final against Phoenix.

Miami FC
On January 14, 2021, following a year off from competitive play, Ballard signed with USL Championship side Miami FC.

Detroit City
On January 10, 2023, Ballard signed a two-year deal with USL Championship side Detroit City.

Honors

Club
Louisville City FC
USL Cup (2): 2017, 2018

References

External links

 
 Richard Ballard at Indiana Hoosiers

1994 births
Living people
American soccer players
Indiana Hoosiers men's soccer players
Derby City Rovers players
DuPont Manual High School alumni
Louisville City FC players
Miami FC players
Detroit City FC players
Association football midfielders
Soccer players from Louisville, Kentucky
USL League Two players
USL Championship players